George Stuart Boyes (31 March 1899 – 11 February 1973) was an English first-class cricketer, born in Southampton, who played for Hampshire County Cricket Club.

Boyes was a slow left-arm bowler with a high action, taking 1415 wickets for Hampshire. He took 100 wickets in a season three times, his best year being 111 at 26.75 in 1933. He twice took a hattrick, one of them when he took his career best figures of 9 for 57 against Somerset at Yeovil in 1938. With the bat he took 413 matches before making his maiden century, only three players in history have waited longer. He was an excellent close fielder and took 498 catches in first-class matches, many of them at short-leg.

His major overseas tour was with the Marylebone Cricket Club (MCC) to India and Ceylon in 1926/7. He took 56 wickets at 18.69 including 7-52 against a Europeans in the East XI at Eden Gardens, Calcutta.

His brother Ken was a professional footballer with Southampton and Bristol Rovers, as well as a member of Hampshire's ground staff.

References

1899 births
Cricketers from Southampton
1973 deaths
English cricketers
Hampshire cricketers
London Counties cricketers
Players cricketers
Marylebone Cricket Club cricketers
English cricketers of 1919 to 1945